This article lists all the confirmed national football squads for the UEFA Women's Euro 1991.

Players marked (c) were named as captain for their national squad.

Denmark

Head coach:  Keld Gantzhorn

Head coach:  Gero Bisanz

Head coach:  Sergio Guenza

Head coach:  Even Pellerud

External links
 1991 - Match Details at RSSSF.com

1991
Squads